Hasta que te conocí is a Mexican biographical television series premiered on TNT Latin America on April 18, 2016, and concluded on June 27, 2016. Based on exclusive interviews of Mary Black-Suárez, the series follows the life of Juan Gabriel from his childhood to his last adulthood. Produced by Somos Productions and BTF Media and distributed by Disney Media Distribution Latin America and Somos Distribution. It stars Julián Román as the titular character.

Plot 
"Hasta que te conocí", is a drama series that follows the steps of Alberto Aguilera Valadez, towards his dream to fame. A tour of 13 episodes based on unpublished evidence that reveals, as never before, the life of the Divo of Juarez: Juan Gabriel. A story that tells how his talent led him to defy his fate and overcome poverty, betrayals and prejudices, to become Juan Gabriel, the most beloved musical icon in Latin America.

Cast 
 Julián Román as Juan Gabriel
 Carlos Elías Yorvick as Teen Alberto Aguilera Valadez / Adán Luna "Juan Gabriel" #2 (17 to 20 years old)
 Alejandro Flores as Teen Alberto #1 (13 years old)
 Matías del Castillo as Child Alberto #3 (8 years old)
 Ricardo Zertuche as Child Alberto #2 (5 years old)
 Nohek Yoali as Child Alberto #1 (3 years old)
 Dolores Heredia as Victoria Valadez
 Marco Treviño as Eduardo Magallanes
 Damayanti Quintanar as Virginia Aguilera Valadez
 Irán Castillo as María Romero
 Verónica Merchant as Esperanza Mcculley
 Luz Treviño as Meche
 Geraldine Galván as Young Virginia Aguilera Valadez
 Verónica Langer as Micaela Alvarado 
 Alejandro Calva as Enrique Okamura
 Ernesto Gómez Cruz as Juan "Juanito" Contreras
 Tenoch Huerta as Nereo
 Andrés Palacios as Daniel Mijares
 Sofía Espinosa as Lola Beltrán
 Ricardo Korkowski as Federico Juarez
 Juan Ríos as David Bencomo
 Andrea Santibañez as Angélica María
 Julio Bracho as General Andrés Puentes 
 Michel Chauvet as Manuel Alvarado
 Giovanna Zacarías as Lucha Villa
 Gabriela Roel as Doña Brígida
 Pablo Azar as Young Gabriel Aguilera
 Cassandra Aguilar as Daniela Romo
 Isabel Burr as Verónica Castro
 Paloma Ruiz de Alda as Rocío Dúrcal

Broadcast 
The series premiered on April 18, 2016, throughout Latin America on TNT. It was confirmed by Telemundo on May 2, 2016, that the series would be airing on the network. The series premiered on Telemundo on September 11, 2016

Episodes

Awards and nominations

References 

Spanish-language television shows
Mexican LGBT-related television shows
2016 Mexican television series debuts
2016 Mexican television series endings